Oh, Lady! Lady!! is a musical with music by Jerome Kern, a book by Guy Bolton and P. G. Wodehouse and lyrics by Wodehouse.  It was written for the Princess Theatre on Broadway, where it played in 1918 and ran for 219 performances.  The story concerns an engaged young man, Bill, whose ex-fiancée arrives unexpectedly on his wedding day. Bill works to convince his old flame that he was not worthy to marry her, but his clumsy efforts do not make him look good to his new fiancée, whose mother already dislikes Bill. A couple of crooks cause further complications. 

The original cast starred Vivienne Segal as Mollie Farringdon.  The songs include "Not Yet", "When Ships Come Home", "Greenwich Village", the innovative "Moon Song" and "Our Little Nest".  The song "Bill", later famous in Show Boat, was cut before the production opened.

Background
The Princess Theatre was a small Broadway house that seated only 299 people.  Theatre agent Elisabeth Marbury urged composer Jerome Kern and librettist Guy Bolton, later joined by British humorist and lyricist/playwright P. G. Wodehouse to write a series of musicals tailored to the theatre, with an intimate style and modest budgets.  These "Princess Theatre shows" had coherent, clever plots that provided an alternative to the other musical entertainments that then dominated Broadway: star-studded revues and extravaganzas of Florenz Ziegfeld, thinly-plotted, musical comedies, Gilbert and Sullivan revivals and gaudy adaptations of European operettas. 

After a modest success, Nobody's Home (1915), Kern and Bolton had a hit with an original musical called Very Good Eddie (1915).  Wodehouse joined the team for another hit, Oh, Boy! (1917), which ran for an extraordinary 463 performances.  Two more of their shows written for the theatre ran at other theatres during the long runs of Very Good Eddie and Oh, Boy!  The shows featured modern American settings and simple scene changes (one set for each act) to suit the small theatre, eschewing operetta traditions of foreign locales and elaborate scenery.  The collaboration was much praised.  According to Gerald Bordman, writing in The Musical Times,

Productions
Oh, Lady! Lady!! debuted in Albany, New York on January 7, 1918 at Bleecker Hall.  After some revisions and touring, the musical opened at the Princess Theatre on February 1, 1918, to uniformly rave reviews and ran for 219 performances, finishing its run at the Casino Theatre.  The production was produced by William Elliott and F. Ray Comstock and directed by Robert Milton and Edward Royce, who also choreographed.  It starred Vivienne Segal as Mollie Farringdon, one of her earliest roles, and Carl Randall as Bill Finch.  Florence Shirley played Fanny Welch, a jewel thief.  Early drafts of the show were called Say When, but the title of the show was eventually taken from a minstrel show catch-phrase.

The New York Times previewed the show, calling the plot "measurably novel" with bright lines and lyrics, said the music demonstrated "easy gaity" and praised the show's casting and "artistic excellence".  The paper called Segal "wonderfully pleasing" and praised both her and Randall's dancing.  Its review began: "Once more Comstock, Elliott, and Gest have shown their allegiance to the policy of supplying popular entertainment which is mitigated by all availabie talent and good taste".  In April 1918, Dorothy Parker wrote in Vanity Fair:

One of Segal's songs, Bill, was cut just two days before the show opened. In the song, Mollie reflects on her love for a young man that her mother dislikes.  Kern used the song nine years later, with the music slightly revised and the lyrics correspondingly revised by Oscar Hammerstein II, in Show Boat (1927).  

Financial disagreements arose between Wodehouse and Kern, and Oh, Lady! Lady!! proved to be the last success in the series, The collaborators went on to other projects, with each of Kern and Wodehouse continuing to work separately with Bolton.  The trio combined for one more show together in 1924, Sitting Pretty, at the Fulton Theatre.  

Recent productions include one by the Musicals Tonight troupe in New York City in 2006 and one by 42nd Street Moon in San Francisco in 2007.

Plot summary
Act I
Debonair but penniless Willoughby "Bill" Finch is set to marry Long Island society gal Molly Farringdon, although he has not charmed his formidable future mother-in-law.  Bill's sassy former fiancée, May, has met and piqued the interest of his affable friend and best man, Hale. Hale recognizes Bill's valet, Spike, as an ex-convict; Spike is guarding the pearls that Bill has bought for Molly as her wedding gift. Spike's sticky-fingered girlfriend, Fanny, tries to persuade him to pocket the wedding gifts, but he wishes that they could put their old prison days behind them. 

May calls unexpectedly on Bill's wedding day, to say that she will soon arrive, and she points out that they are still engaged. Bill and Hale scheme to convince her that he is a ladies' man, and not worthy to marry her. Hale catches Fanny trying to pocket the pearls and forces her to agree to help with Bill's charade. May arrives; it turns out that she has been hired as a dressmaker for the wedding by Molly's mother. May admits that she is no longer interested in Bill and wishes him well, and she returns Hale's interest. But when Molly returns, she is confronted by Fanny, who is pretending to be Bill's girlfriend – and the pearls are missing.

 Act II
That night, Hale hosts a party on the roof of Bill's Greenwich Village apartment. Molly's mother has called off the wedding. May is flirting with various men, making Hale jealous. Spike and Fanny arrive to announce that they are now married. Fanny tells Spike that she does not have the pearls, but she is very nervous when a British private detective shows up. 

Molly comes to talk with Bill, and they have a romantic moment before her mother shows up. Bill awkwardly tries to explain to Mrs. Farrington what happened, and Hale asks May to marry him.  But Molly and her mother find May at Bill's bedroom door and conclude that Bill had been entertaining her in his apartment. Finally, the real thief confesses, Molly finds out that May and Hale are engaged, and a happy ending ensues with a double wedding.

Roles and original cast
Mollie Farrington  – Vivienne Segal
Mrs. Farrington, her mother – Margaret Dale 
Willoughby "Bill" Finch – Carl Randall 
Hale Underwood, Bill's friend – Harry C. Browne 
Spike Hudgins, an ex-con valet – Edward Abeles 
Fanny Welch, Spike's pick-pocket sweetheart – Florence Shirley 
May Barber, Willoughby's ex-fiancée – Carroll McComas 
Cyril Twombley, a clueless British detective – Reginald Mason 
William Watty, a building superintendent – Harry Fisher
Mollie's friends

Musical numbers

Act 1      
I'm to Be Married Today – Mollie Farrington and Girls 
Not Yet – Mollie and Bill Finch 
Do It Now – Spike Hudgins, Hale Underwood and Bill
Our Little Nest – Spike and Fanny Welch 
Do Look at Him! – Mollie and Girls 
Oh, Lady! Lady! – Bill and Girls 
You Found Me and I Found You – May Barber and Hale 

Act 2      
Moon (The Moon Song) – Hale and Chorus
Waiting Around the Corner – May and Boys 
Little Ships Come Sailing Home – Mollie and Girls 
Before I Met You – Bill and Mollie 
Greenwich Village – Bill, Spike and Fanny 
Wheatless Days – Hale and May 
It's a Hard, Hard World for a Man – Bill, Hale and Cyril Twombley

Adaptations and recordings
In 1920 the musical was adapted into a silent film, Oh, Lady, Lady starring Bebe Daniels. In 1927 Wodehouse adapted the book of "Oh, Lady, Lady" into a novel called The Small Bachelor. A recording of a concert performance is available from the Comic Opera Guild.

Notes

References
Bloom, Ken and Vlastnik, Frank. Broadway Musicals: The 101 Greatest Shows of all Time. Black Dog & Leventhal Publishers, New York, 2004. 
Green, Benny. P. G. Wodehouse – A Literary Biography, Pavilion Books, London, 1981.

External links

Oh, Lady! Lady!! at the Internet Broadway Database
New York Times review of the Carnegie Hall 1985 concert production

Broadway musicals
1918 musicals
Original musicals
Musicals by Jerome Kern